Tod eines Schülers (A student's death) is a German television series directed by Claus Peter Witt, based on a script by Robert Stromberger.

The series is about the fictional suicide by train of student Claus Wagner. Each episode begins with Wagner's death, looking into the subject from different points of view.

Cast
Till Topf: Claus Wagner (main character)
Günter Strack: Horst Wagner (Claus Wagner's father)
Eva Zlonitzky: Yvonne Wagner (Claus Wagner's mother)
Hans Helmut Dickow: Löschner (the investigating police inspector)
Ute Christensen: Inge Reitz (Claus Wagner's girl-friend)

Episodes

Accolades
Goldene Kamera in 1981.

Consequences
Even though the series received positive reviews, and is still considered a milestone in German television history, it was denounced by parents' associations. A major allegation was the possibility of inducing copycat suicides.

See also
List of German television series

External links
 

German drama television series
1981 German television series debuts
1981 German television series endings
German-language television shows
ZDF original programming
Grimme-Preis for fiction winners
Suicide in television